Mark Stein (born March 11, 1947) is an American keyboardist, composer and arranger, who is a member of the Psychedelic rock group Vanilla Fudge. Stein also worked in the Tommy Bolin band and Alice Cooper's band during 1978 and 1979.

Biography

Early life
Stein was born and raised in Bayonne, New Jersey. He began playing piano at age four and later attempted the accordion. Upon being exposed to rock and roll in the 1950s, Stein settled on the guitar. He worked his way through various bands in his high school. While performing with one of these early groups, he spied an "old beat-up organ on the stage and started jamming on it."

Vanilla Fudge 
Stein and Tim Bogert had played in a local band called Rick Martin & The Showmen. The pair were so impressed by the swinging, organ-heavy sound of The Rascals they decided to form their own band in 1965. Originally calling themselves The Electric Pigeons, they soon shortened the name to The Pigeons.  Eventually, Carmine Appice and Vince Martell joined the band and they changed their name to Vanilla Fudge when they signed to Atlantic Records. The name change came because Atlantic didn't like the name The Pigeons. The origin of the name Vanilla Fudge came from a woman called Dee Dee, who worked at the Page 2 Club in Long Island, who stated her grandfather nicknamed her Vanilla Fudge. The bands debut was released in August 1967 and is a Gold Record. Their cover of The Supremes' You Keep Me Hangin' On is their most well known track. Vanilla Fudge are known for performing slow and heavier covers of fast and upbeat songs. Later hits include a cover of Junior Walker & The All Stars’ 1965 single Shotgun.

The band has been cited as; "one of the few American links between psychedelia and what soon became heavy metal."

As of March 2023, Stein, Appice and Martell still continue to tour as Vanilla Fudge.

Solo
Mark was in the Tommy Cooper band from 1978 to 1979.

Mark published the autobiography, You Keep Me Hangin’ On in 2011. Stein released the solo album There's A Light was on November 26 2021. During the pandemic of 2020, Mark wrote, recorded and released the single “We Are One”, a reflection on the Black Lives Matter movement.

Influences
Stein himself influenced organist Jon Lord (1941-2012) of the band Deep Purple. Lord, in a 1989 interview said;  "[he] used to listen to Mark Stein of Vanilla Fudge in the late sixties. He was a useful source of tricks on the Hammond."

Discography

Vanilla Fudge

Studio albums

Collections and live albums 
 Vanilla Fudge – The Fantastic Vanilla (1969)
 Best of Vanilla Fudge (1982)
 The Best of Vanilla Fudge – Live (1991)
 Psychedelic Sundae – The Best of Vanilla Fudge (1993)
 The Return – Live in Germany Part 1 (2003)
 The Real Deal – Vanilla Fudge Live (2003)
 Rocks the Universe – Live in Germany Part 2 (2003)
 Good Good Rockin' – Live at Rockpalast (2007)
 Orchestral Fudge (live) (2008)
 When Two Worlds Collide (live) (2008)
 Box of Fudge – Rhino Handmade (2010)
 The Complete Atco Singles (2014)
 Live at Sweden Rock 2016: The 50th Anniversary (live) (2017)

Singles

Solo

Albums 

 There’s A Light (2021)

Singles 

 We Are One (2020)

Bibliography 

 You Keep Me Hangin’ On (released 2011)

Notes

References

External links
 Mark Stein's official website
 Mark Stein Interview NAMM Oral History Library (2021)

1947 births
Living people
American rock keyboardists
American rock singers
Musicians from Bayonne, New Jersey
Vanilla Fudge members
American male organists
Singer-songwriters from New Jersey
20th-century American male musicians
20th-century organists
21st-century American keyboardists
21st-century organists
21st-century American male musicians
20th-century American keyboardists
American male singer-songwriters
Singer-songwriters from New York (state)